Gruzino may refer to:
Gruzino estate, an estate in Novgorod Oblast, Russia
Gruzino (rural locality), name of several rural localities in Russia